The 2005 Copa Indonesia Final was a football match that took place on 19 November 2005 at Gelora Bung Karno Stadium in Jakarta. It was the inaugural final of Piala Indonesia, Indonesia's premier football cup competition. The match was contested by Persija Jakarta and Arema Malang. Arema won the match 4–3 after extra time and entered the group stage of the 2006 AFC Champions League.

Road to the final

Note: In all results below, the score of the finalist is given first (H: home; A: away).

Match details